Coach Trip 3 was the third series of Coach Trip in the United Kingdom, that was filmed between September and October 2008 and began showing in May 2009. The show's format after a break of 3 years remained unchanged from the previous series but the titles were new along with the timeslot: seven couples travelling around Europe on a coach like series 1 for 30 days attempting vote off the least popular couples with visits to Croatia, the Czech Republic, Hungary, Liechtenstein and Luxembourg for the first time. Tour guide Brendan Sheerin and coach driver Paul Donald both returned for this series, which aired on Channel 4 with a similar end to series 2. David Quantick was the narrator and MT04 MTT was the registration number plate for the first and only time.

Contestants

Voting History

Notes

 After the vote was cancelled with 2 couples absent, Sandra & Michelle were post-vote arrivals on Day 19.
 On Day 24, due to the announcement of the red terror, Brendan instated a new voting rule - on vote time the couple who received the most votes would get an immediate red card, this happened to be James & Tracy, this system used after arrival in Hungary and also returned on Celebrity Coach Trip, Series 6, series 7 and Christmas Coach Trip.
 Delia & Jacqui walked off the trip on the same day as when they arrived after only 16 hours due to arguments with Brendan.
No timekeepers or removals in series

The trip day by day

References

2009 British television seasons
Coach Trip series
Montenegrin culture
Television shows set in Austria
Television shows set in Belgium
Television shows set in Croatia
Television shows set in France
Television shows set in Germany
Television shows set in Hungary
Television shows set in Italy
Television shows set in Liechtenstein
Television shows set in Luxembourg
Television shows set in Switzerland
Television shows set in the Czech Republic